Azucena is an unincorporated community in Tensas Parish, Louisiana, United States.

History
Azucena was named after Azucena Plantation, which likely took its name from a character in Verdi's opera Il trovatore.

References

Unincorporated communities in Tensas Parish, Louisiana
Unincorporated communities in Louisiana